Hugo Darnaut, originally Hugo Fix, (28 November 1851, Dessau - 9 January 1937, Vienna) was an Austrian landscape painter.

Biography 
His father, Michael Fix, was a court performer who went by the stage name "Darnaut". He was raised in Graz and began by studying decorative art in Vienna with a theater painter named Heinrich Burghart, then enrolled at the Academy of Fine Arts, where he studied with Eduard Peithner von Lichtenfels. He became a member of the Vienna Künstlerhaus in 1877. During the early 1890s, he spent some time with  Gustav Schönleber in Karlsruhe.

Following the death of Emil Jakob Schindler, he took over the Schloss Plankenberg in Sieghartskirchen, where Schindler had operated a school of landscape painting. He also organized large-scale exhibitions in Berlin, Paris and Venice, among others. In 1900, he and the architecture painter, created a monumental bird's-eye view of Vienna for the Exposition Universelle. From 1913 to 1918, he was President of the Vienna Cooperative of Fine Artists.

In 1925, he became an honorary member of the Technische Universität Wien and, five years later, he was named a Bürger (citizen) of Vienna.

Selected paintings

References 

 Felix Czeike (Ed.): Darnaut Hugo. In: Historisches Lexikon Wien. Volume 1, Kremayr & Scheriau, Wien 1992, 
 Peter Weninger, Peter Müller: Die Schule von Plankenberg. Emil Jakob Schindler und der österreichische Stimmungsimpressionismus. Akademische Druck- und Verlagsanstalt, Graz 1991, P 56/57, .

External links 

ArtNet: More works by Darnaut.

1851 births
1937 deaths
19th-century Austrian painters
19th-century Austrian male artists
20th-century Austrian painters
Austrian landscape painters
People from Dessau-Roßlau
Academy of Fine Arts Vienna alumni
20th-century Austrian male artists